The Warsaw metropolitan area (known in Polish as: aglomeracja warszawska or Miejski Obszar Funkcjonalny Warszawy) is the metropolitan area of Warsaw, the capital of Poland. The metropolitan area covers ten counties in the Masovian Voivodeship, with an area of 6,100 km² and a population of around 3.5 million in 2022. The area constitutes a separate NUTS 2 unit, as well as a separate police region with a dedicated Capital Metropolitan Police Headquarters, both of them carved out from the Masovian Voivodeship as an exception, as Polish NUTS 2 areas and police regions are in general identical to the territories of voivodeships.

The largest cities or towns within the metropolitan area are Warsaw, Pruszków, Legionowo, Otwock, Mińsk Mazowiecki, Piaseczno and Wołomin.

Public transport in the metropolitan area is served by the Warsaw Transport Authority (Zarząd Transportu Miejskiego).

Economy 
In 2021 Warsaw's gross metropolitan product was €100 billion. This puts Warsaw in 20th place among cities in European Union.

See also 
 Metropolitan areas in Poland

References

External links 
 Spatial Development Plan for the Masovian Voivodeship 2018

Geography of Warsaw
Metropolitan areas of Poland
Warsaw-related lists